Tobias Hellman (born 16 January 1973 in Lidingö) is a Swedish former alpine skier. He competed in the 1994 Winter Olympics.

During the 1992 World Junior Alpine Skiing Championships in Maribor, Slovenia he won the men's slalom, Super-G and Alpine combined skiing events, ended up second in giant slalom and third in the downhill skiing event.

References

External links
 sports-reference.com

1973 births
Swedish male alpine skiers
Alpine skiers at the 1994 Winter Olympics
Olympic alpine skiers of Sweden
People from Lidingö Municipality
Living people
Sportspeople from Stockholm County